Urige Buta (born 28 November 1978) is a Norwegian athlete. He was born in Ambo in the Oromiya Region, Ethiopia. He qualified for the marathon at the 2012 Summer Olympics in London, where he finished in 36th place. He was Norwegian champion in 10,000 m in 2005 and 2007.

References

External links

Norwegian male marathon runners
Ethiopian male marathon runners
1978 births
Living people
Sportspeople from Oromia Region
Ethiopian emigrants to Norway
Athletes (track and field) at the 2012 Summer Olympics
Olympic athletes of Norway